Moussa Traoré (25 September 1936 – 15 September 2020) was a Malian soldier, politician, and dictator who was President of Mali from 1968 to 1991. As a Lieutenant, he led the military ousting of President Modibo Keïta in 1968. Thereafter he served as head of state until March 1991, when he was overthrown by popular protests and a military coup.

He was twice condemned to death in the 1990s, but eventually pardoned on both occasions and freed in 2002. He retired from public life and died in 2020.

Early life
Born in Kayes Region, Traoré studied at Kita and at the military academy in Fréjus, France. He returned to Mali in 1960, after its 1959 independence. He became second lieutenant in 1961, and lieutenant in 1963. He went to Tanganyika (which later together with Zanzibar formed the new state of Tanzania) as military instructor to its liberation movements. He then became instructor at the École militaire interarmes in Kati.

Head of state, 1968–1991
On 19 November 1968 he took part in the coup d'état which deposed President Modibo Keïta. He became president of the Comité militaire de libération nationale, which made him effective Head of state of Mali. All political activity was banned. A police state was run by Captain Tiécoro Bagayoko. Informers monitored academics and teachers, mostly hostile to the military rule. The socialist economic policies of Modibo Keïta were partially dropped. In 1972–1973, a major drought hit Mali.

In 1974, Traoré issued a changed constitution for a Malian Second Republic, which was inaugurated in 1978, and was purported to move Mali toward civilian rule. However, the military leaders remained in power. In September 1976, a new political party was established, the Democratic Union of the Malian People (UDPM), based on the concept of non-ideological democratic centralism. Single-party presidential and legislative elections were held in June 1979. As general secretary of the UPDM, Traoré was automatically elected to a six-year term as president, and he was confirmed in office with 99 percent of the vote.  The UDPM was intended to be the main link between the government and the people. Among its auxiliaries were the Union Nationale des Femmes du Mali and Union Nationale des Jeunes du Mali, compulsory organisations for women and young people.

In 1977 ex-president Modibo Keïta died in detention, in suspicious circumstances. The government reacted strongly, and made violent arrests. On 28 February 1978, Moussa Traoré had arrested both Tiécoro Bagayoko and Kissima Doukara, defense and security minister, on accusations of plotting a coup. In trying to move to more open politics, he appointed the historian Alpha Oumar Konaré as arts minister. In 1980, student demonstrations were broken up, and their leader Abdoul Karim Camara ("Cabral") died from torture. In 1982, he was made commander-in-chief. Traoré was chairman of the Organization of African Unity from May 1988 to July 1989.

Traoré was reelected in 1985, again as the only candidate. Later that year, the UDPM-controlled legislature amended the constitution to exempt him from the two-term limit.

The political situation stabilized during 1981 and 1982, and remained generally calm throughout the 1980s. The UDPM began attracting additional members as it demonstrated that it could counter an effective voice against the excesses of local administrative authorities. Shifting its attention to Mali's economic difficulties, the government approved plans for cereal marketing liberalization, reform in the state enterprise system, new incentives to private enterprise, and an agreement with the International Monetary Fund (IMF). However, by 1990, there was growing dissatisfaction with the demands for austerity imposed by the IMF's economic reform programs and the perception that the president and his close associates were not themselves adhering to those demands. As in other African countries, demands for multi-party democracy increased. Traoré allowed some reforms, including the establishment of an independent press and independent political associations, but insisted that Mali was not ready for democracy.

Opposition and overthrow
In 1990, the National Congress for Democratic Initiative (Congrès National d’Initiative démocratique, CNID) was set up by the lawyer Mountaga Tall, and the Alliance for Democracy in Mali (Alliance pour la démocratie au Mali, ADEMA) by Abdramane Baba and historian Alpha Oumar Konaré. These with the Association des élèves et étudiants du Mali (AEEM) and the Association Malienne des Droits de l'Homme (AMDH) aimed to contest Moussa Traoré's rule, with a plural political life.

On 22 March 1991 a huge protest march in central Bamako was put down violently, with estimates of those killed reaching 150. Four days later, the commander of Traoré's presidential guard, Col. Amadou Toumani Touré, removed Traoré from office and arrested him. A Transitional Committee for the Salvation of the People was set up under Touré's chairmanship, which oversaw a transition to democracy a year later.

Trials and pardons
Imprisoned in Markala local Prison, in February 1993, Traoré was condemned to death for "political crimes", largely focused on the killing of around 300 pro-democracy demonstrators in Bamako, but his sentence was later commuted. In 1999 he was once more condemned to death  with his wife Mariam Traoré, for "economic crimes": the embezzling of the equivalent of US$350,000 during his rule. President Alpha Oumar Konaré commuted these sentences to life imprisonment. Shortly before leaving office, on 29 May 2002, he further pardoned the couple, for the sake of national reconciliation, a stance which incoming president Amadou Toumani Touré championed.

Traoré's once reviled legacy somewhat softened under Touré, with the former dictator recognised at least informally as a former head of state and many former supporters now rallying around Chogel Maiga's Patriotic Movement for Renewal party (Mouvement Patriotique pour le Renouveau, MPR). Both Traoré and his wife retired from public life, in part due to ill health.

Death
Traoré died on 15 September 2020, ten days before his 84th birthday.

References

Further reading

Pascal James Imperato. Traore, Gen. Moussa in  Historical Dictionary of Mali, pp. 242–245. Scarecrow Press/ Metuchen. NJ – London (1986) 
Moussa Traoré. (2008). In Encyclopædia Britannica. Retrieved 24 October 2008, from Encyclopædia Britannica Online.

1936 births
2020 deaths
Malian Muslims
Leaders who took power by coup
Leaders ousted by a coup
Traoré clan members
Malian military personnel
Democratic Union of the Malian People politicians
Malian prisoners sentenced to death
Prisoners sentenced to death by Mali
Recipients of Malian presidential pardons
People of French West Africa
People from Kayes
Heads of government who were later imprisoned
Muslim socialists